Viktor Knutsson (4 January 1886 – 21 January 1969) was a Swedish sports shooter. He competed at the 1920 Summer Olympics and the 1924 Summer Olympics.

References

External links
 

1886 births
1969 deaths
Swedish male sport shooters
Olympic shooters of Sweden
Shooters at the 1920 Summer Olympics
Shooters at the 1924 Summer Olympics
People from Örnsköldsvik Municipality
Sportspeople from Västernorrland County
20th-century Swedish people